Ropica stolata is a species of beetle in the family Cerambycidae. It was described by Pascoe in 1865.

References

stolata
Beetles described in 1865